Visual Build is GUI software for Windows that enables software developers and build masters to create an automated, repeatable process for software builds. It has built-in support for integrating various development tools into the build process. Projects are stored as XML to facilitate storage in version control systems.

See also
Software build automation

References 

 Scott Mitchell, Automated Build Process, Real-World E-Mail Tasks and More, MSDN Magazine, March 2006 issue

External links

Build automation